Xylene cyanol can be used as an electrophoretic color marker, or tracking dye, to monitor the process of agarose gel electrophoresis and polyacrylamide gel electrophoresis.  Bromophenol blue and orange G can also be used for this purpose.

Once mixed with the sample, the concentration of xylene cyanol is typically about 0.005% to 0.03%.

Migration speed
In 1% agarose gels, xylene cyanol migrates at about the same rate as a 4 to 5 kilobase pair DNA fragment, although this depends on the buffer used.  Xylene cyanol on a 6% polyacrylamide gel migrates at the speed of a 140 base pair DNA fragment. On 20% denaturating (7 M urea) polyacrylamide gel electrophoresis (PAGE), xylene cyanol migrates at about the rate of 25 bases oligonucleotide.

References

External links
 Xylene cyanol at OpenWetWare

Triarylmethane dyes
Benzenesulfonates
Organic sodium salts
Anilines
Acid dyes